John Baum may refer to:

Johnny Baum (born 1946), American basketball player
John Baum, alias of John Connor in the television series Terminator: The Sarah Connor Chronicles